Breaking the Chains may refer to:

 Breaking the Chains (album), a 1983 album by American glam metal band Dokken
 "Breaking the Chains" (song), a 1982 single by Dokken
 "Breaking the Chains", a song from the 1981 album Recovery by Runrig
 Breaking the Chains (Pegazus album), a 2000 album by Australian heavy metal band Pegazus